Michael Chi Ho Luk (born 22 August 1986) is a former Hong Kong professional footballer who currently plays as an amateur player for Hong Kong First Division club Hoi King.

He also holds a Canadian passport in addition to his Hong Kong passport.

Early life
Luk was born on 22 August 1986 in Hong Kong to parents Joe Luk and Susan Choi. Michael Luk lived in Scarborough, Ontario after his family left Hong Kong when he was aged 5.

Club career

North America
Luk started his football career in Ontario Football club Woodbridge Strikers in 2002 and he moved to North York Hearts-Azzurri in 2003. His performance attracted national team coach and played for Canada U-17 in this season.

Between 2005 and 2008, Luk played for St. John's Red Storm. He mostly played as defender in the team but he also played games as midfielder. He studied in Winthrop University after his high school education, and he continued his career in Winthrop Eagles soccer team.

Luk played for Premier Development League club Newark Ironbound Express in 2008 and Toronto Lynx in 2009. Toronto Lynx set him as one of main players and he was given the number 10 shirt upon his arrival Toronto. He scored his first goal of formal competition in the league match against Fort Wayne Fever in Edelweiss Park on 11 July 2009. In 2010, he signed with Portugal FC of the Canadian Soccer League, making his debut for the club on May 28, 2010 in a match against Montreal Impact Academy. Shortly after Nanchang Bayi offered Luk a trial for the first team in June 2010 and since he was born in Hong Kong the Chinese Football Association counted him as a local player. However, Nanchang Hengyuan abandoned Luk after Asqar Jadigerov joined the team.

Hong Kong
Michael Luk came back to Hong Kong and had a trial in Sun Hei in South Central China in August 2010. He passed the trial and moved to the first team for 2010–11 season. On 7 September 2010, Luk made his professional career debut, as a substitute for Chao Pengfei in a 3–0 victory at home to Tai Chung.

Luk scored his first goal of his professional career by a long-range volley shoot on the 2nd-minute of the league match against Citizen on 17 October 2010. He also finished his first hat-trick of his senior career by another two goals on the 56th-minute by direct free kick and the 64th-minute by penalty. At the end, it is theatrical that Sun Hei lost the game by 4–5.

After a year flawless performance, Luk was handed number 10 shirt, last worn by captain Chan Yiu Lun, and was planned as leading player in 2011–12 season. Luk was start player in opening match of 100th First Division League season drew defending Kitchee on 3 September 2011.

On 1 July 2019, it was announced that Luk would leave Southern after four seasons. A month later, Luk was confirmed as Tai Po player on 6 August 2019.

On 7 November 2020, Luk joined Hong Kong First Division club Hoi King.

International career
Michael Luk was selected by Canada men's national under-17 soccer team for friendlies against United States and Jamaica in 2003. He played 5 matches in this year with one start-up chance but had no score. Canada did not win these 5 matches.

Michael Luk made his international debut for the Hong Kong national football team on 14 November 2012 against Malaysia. He replaced Huang Yang on the 90th minute.

Statistics

Club statistics
As of 9 May 2013

International statistics

Canada U17
As of 13 April 2012

Hong Kong
As of 9 December 2012

Honours

Club
South China
 Hong Kong First Division: 2012–13

Sun Hei
 Hong Kong Senior Shield: 2011–12

References

External links
 
 
 Profile in St. John's Red Storm
 

1986 births
Living people
Association football midfielders
Canada men's youth international soccer players
Canadian expatriate soccer players
Canadian soccer players
Expatriate soccer players in the United States
Hong Kong emigrants to Canada
Hong Kong footballers
Hong Kong international footballers
Jersey Express S.C. players
Soccer players from Toronto
Sportspeople from Scarborough, Toronto
St. John's Red Storm men's soccer players
South China AA players
Sun Hei SC players
Toronto Lynx players
Southern District FC players
Tai Po FC players
USL League Two players
Winthrop Eagles men's soccer players
Canadian Soccer League (1998–present) players
SC Toronto players